Tempo rubato ('free in the presentation', literally ) is a musical term referring to expressive and rhythmic freedom by a slight speeding up and then slowing down of the tempo of a piece at the discretion of the soloist or the conductor. Rubato is an expressive shaping of music that is a part of phrasing.

While rubato is often loosely taken to mean playing with expressive and rhythmic freedom,  it was traditionally used specifically in the context of expression as speeding up and then slowing down the tempo. In the past, expressive and free playing (beyond only rubato) was often associated with the terms "ad libitum". Rubato, even when not notated, is often used liberally by musicians, e.g. singers frequently use it intuitively to let the tempo of the melody expressively shift slightly and freely above that of the accompaniment. This intuitive shifting leads to rubato's main effect: making music sound expressive and natural. Nineteenth century composer-pianist Frédéric Chopin is often mentioned in the context of rubato (see Chopin's technique and performance style).

The term rubato existed even before the romantic era. In the 18th century, rubato meant expressing rhythm spontaneously, with freedom. In many cases, it was achieved by playing uneven notes. This idea was used, among others, by Ernst Wilhelm Wolf and Carl Philipp Emanuel Bach.  In addition to that, Leopold Mozart claimed that the accompaniment should remain strictly in tempo.

In the mid 18th century, the meaning of rubato began to change gradually. People were using the term as being able to move notes freely back and forth. Johann Friedrich Agricola interpreted rubato as "stealing the time".

As time moves on to the 19th century, people recognized rubato yet slightly differently. In Chopin's music rubato functioned as a way to make a melody more emotional through changing the tempo by, for instance, accelerando, ritenuto and syncopations. Chopin "often played with the melody subtly lingering or passionately anticipating the beat while the accompaniment stayed at least relatively, if not strictly, in time". In this case, rubato is used as a concept of flexibility of tempo for a more expressive melody.

Types
One can distinguish two types of rubato: in one the tempo of the melody is flexible, while the accompaniment is kept in typical regular pulse (yet not rigidly in mechanical fashion; but adjusting to the melody as necessary—see below). Another type affects melody and accompaniment. While it is often associated with music of the Romantic Period, classical performers frequently use rubato for emotional expressiveness in all kinds of works.

The opinion given by Tom S. Wotton, that "every bar has its proper time value" may be regarded as an inaccurate description: Karl Wilson Gehrkens mentions "duration taken from one measure [...] and given to another" which implies bars of differing duration. Rubato relates to phrasing; and since phrases often go over multiple bars; it is often impossible (and also not desired) for each bar to be identically long.

Early twentieth century 
Early twentieth-century rubato seems to be very eventful. Robert Philip in his book Early recordings and musical style: Changing tastes in instrumental performance, 1900-1950 specifies three types of rubato used at that time: accelerando and rallentando, tenuto and agogic accents, and melodic rubato.

Accelerando and rallentando 

Late 19th century dictionaries of musical terms defined tempo rubato as "robbed or stolen time." This effect can be achieved by a slight quickening of speed in ascending passages, for instance, and calando on descending phrases. Ignacy Jan Paderewski says that tempo rubato relies on "more or less important slackening or quickening of the time or rate of the movement." Many theoreticians and performers claimed at that time that the "robbed" time must be eventually "paid back" later within the same measure, so that the change of tempo would not affect the length of the measure. However, the balance theory caused controversy, as many theoreticians dismissed the assumption that the "stolen" time should necessarily be "paid back." In the third edition of Grove's Dictionary we read: "The rule has been given and repeated indiscriminately that the "robbed" time must be "paid back" within the bar. That is absurd, because the bar line is a notational, not a musical, matter. But there is no necessity to pay back even within the phrase: it is the metaphor that is wrong."

Paderewski also discarded this theory saying: "(...) the value of notes diminished in one period through an accelerando, cannot always be restored in another through a ritardando. What is lost is lost."

Some theoreticians, however, rejected even the idea that rubato relies on accelerando and ritardando. They were not recommending that a performance should be strictly metronomic, but they came up with a theory saying that rubato should consist of tenuto and shortened notes.

Tenuto and agogic accents 

The first writer who extended the theory of "agogics" was Hugo Riemann in his book Musikalische Dynamik und Agogik (1884). The theory was based on the idea of using small changes of rhythm and tempo for expression. Riemann used the term "agogic accent", by which he meant accentuation achieved by lengthening of a note.

The theory found many supporters. J. Alfred Johnstone called the idea of agogic accents "quasi tempo rubato." He also expressed his appreciation for this theory, saying that "modern editors are coming to recognize it as one of the important principles of expressive interpretation." In his illustration of agogic accents in the Mendelssohn's Andante and Rondo Capriccioso op. 14, Johnstone explains, that even though the rhythm consists of equal quarter notes, they should not be played the same length; the highest note of the phrase ought to be the longest while other notes shortened proportionally. One of the musicians known for using agogic accents in their playing was the violinist Joseph Joachim.

Some writers compared this type of rubato to declamation in speech. This idea was widely developed by singers. According to Gordon Heller: "If groups of notes happen to occur, which have to be sung to one word, the student must be careful to make the first note very slightly longer – though only very slightly – than the rest of the group. Should a triplet be written by the composer, care must be taken here to make the first note of the three a trifle longer than the rest, and thus give a musicianly rendering of it. To hurry the time in such a pace would spoil the rhythm..."

Melodic rubato 

Both of the theories described above had their opponents and supporters. There was one question, though, that emerged in reference to both. Regardless if a melody is released from strict note values by accelerando and ritardando or agogic accents, should the accompaniment follow the melody or remain strict in time? The latter means that the melody would be either behind or ahead of the accompaniment for a moment. Eventually, in spite of doubts of some, it has become a tradition that the accompaniment did not follow the flexibility of the melody. As Franklin Taylor writes: "It should be observed that any independent accompaniment to a rubato phrase must always keep strict time, and it is, therefore, quite possible that no note of a rubato melody will fall exactly with its corresponding note in the accompaniment, except, perhaps, the first note in the bar."

Robert Philip's further research shows that these three components (accelerando and rallentando, tenuto and agogic accents, and melodic rubato) were most often used together, as each performer could combine all of them and give the melody flexibility in their own specific way.

Chopin 
Frederic Chopin (1810–1849) wrote the term rubato in fourteen different works. All of the spots marked rubato in his fourteen compositions have a flowing melody in the right hand and several accompanying notes in the left hand. Thus, Chopin's rubato can be approached with delaying or anticipating those melody notes. According to descriptions of Chopin's playing, he played with the melody slightly delaying or excitedly anticipating the beat while the left-hand accompaniment went on playing in time.

Usually, his usage of the term rubato in a score suggested a brief effect. However, when the term sempre rubato was marked, it indicated a rubato that continued for about two measures. Interestingly, Chopin never marked a tempo following rubato. This leaves the length of the “momentary effect” up to the interpretation of the performer. Therefore, the performer must understand the purpose of why rubato is indicated from the composer.

There are three purposes why Chopin marks the word rubato in his compositions: to articulate a repetition, to emphasize an expressive high point or appoggiatura and to set a particular mood at the beginning of a piece.

The first main purpose for which Chopin marks rubato is to articulate the repetition of a unit of music. For example, the rubato marked in bar 9 in Mazurka Op. 6 No. 1 points out the beginning of the repetition after the first eight-measure unit. Another example of this usage of rubato occurs in the Mazurka Op. 7 No. 3. In this piece, the theme begins at measure 9 and repeats at measure 17, which is where the rubato is marked. From this, the performer is given the cue to approach the repeated material differently the second time it occurs.                                   

Chopin's second main purpose for using rubato is to create an intensely expressive moment such as at the high point of a melodic line or at an appoggiatura. For example, in the Nocturne Op. 9 No. 2, bar 26 has an intensely singing moment where the melody leaps up to an E-flat. However, this E-flat is not the highest point of the phrase. Therefore, Chopin marked poco rubato to signify to the player that they can emphasize the intensely expressive moment, but to also hold back for the actual climax occurring one measure later. A second example of rubato used at a singing moment is in his Second Piano Concerto. In a similar situation, the melody leaps up to three A-flat played consecutively and the rubato marked tells the player to perform them in a singing quality.   

Chopin primarily marks rubato to emphasize expressive melodic lines or repetition. However, in some cases, he also uses rubato to establish a certain mood at the beginning of a piece. The Nocturne Op. 15 No. 3 is one of the examples of rubato being used for setting up a mood. In the Nocturne Op. 15 No. 3, Chopin marked Languido e rubato in the first bar, as a general suggestion of the work's comprehensive way of delivery. The rubato in a languid manner would affect the tempo, tone color, touch, and dynamics, which influence performers to set the mood at the beginning of the piece.

Quotations

Misinterpretations
Definitions of musical concepts (such as rubato) cause misinterpretations if they disregard artistic musical expression. The type of rubato in which the accompaniment is kept regular does not require absolute regularity; the accompaniment still gives full regard to the melody (often the singer or soloist) and yields tempo where necessary:

In the music of Chopin, the word "rubato" appears in just 14 of his works. While other composers (such as Schumann and Mahler) are ignored in regards to this issue, we often fail to consider the German terms, like "Zeit lassen", for the same principle. The fact that "rubato" is more an aspect of performance than a compositional device makes us question whether some other terms that could be interpreted as tempo distortions, like "cedéz", "espressivo", "calando",  "incalzando", or even Brahms' special "dolce" and "sostenuto", are clear-cut in performance.

Examples
Sergei Rachmaninoff is one of the composers who uses the proper term "tempo rubato" in some passages of his orchestral works, such as the buzzy introduction for the 2nd movement of his Symphonic Dances (Rachmaninoff).

Another example, is the 2nd theme of the first movement of Symphony No. 3 (Rachmaninoff): 

Rachmaninoff's rubato re-created the eloquence and sure musical instinct that must have characterised the rubato-practise of Mozart, Beethoven or Chopin.

References

External links
Articles

Stolen Time: The History of Tempo Rubato by Richard Hudson - Lloyd, William. The Musical Times 136, no. 1829 (1995): 362. doi:10.2307/1004338.

Tempo Rubato by Ignacy Jan Paderewski (Polish Music Journal Vol. 4; No. 1; Summer 2001. )Chapter contributed to Henry T. Finck's book Success in music and how it is won (1909)
Tempo rubato, and other essays (c.1920) Constantin von Sternberg (1852–1924)
Nineteenth-century Musical Agogics as an Element in Gerard Manley Hopkins' Prosody by Christopher R. Wilson, Comparative Literature, 52/1 (Winter 2000), 72–86.
''Rubato and The Middleground by Maury Yeston

Italian words and phrases
Rhythm and meter